Cho Young-jae(Korean:조영재) (born 10 January 1985) is a South Korean ice sledge hockey player. He played in the 2010 and 2014 Paralympic Winter Games. He won a silver medal at the 2012 IPC Ice Sledge Hockey World Championships. Cho was a member of South Korea's bronze medal winning team in para ice hockey at the 2018 Winter Paralympics.

References

External links 
 

1985 births
Living people
South Korean sledge hockey players
Paralympic sledge hockey players of South Korea
Paralympic bronze medalists for South Korea
Para ice hockey players at the 2018 Winter Paralympics
Medalists at the 2018 Winter Paralympics
Paralympic medalists in sledge hockey
People from Chuncheon
Sportspeople from Gangwon Province, South Korea